Brûlé Lake is a lake in geographic Stewart Township, Nipissing District in Northeastern Ontario, Canada. It is part of the Saint Lawrence River drainage basin.

Brûlé Lake has five unnamed inflows: one at the east; one at the southeast; one at the south; one at the west; and one at the north. The primary outflow is an unnamed creek at the north which heads in the direction of Jocko Lake, which flows via the Jocko River and the Ottawa River to the Saint Lawrence River.

See also
List of lakes in Ontario

References

Lakes of Nipissing District